Aphantorhaphopsis is a genus of flies in the family Tachinidae. Some consider this to be a subgenus of Siphona, most European workers seem content that this is a genus in its own right. They are known from the Palearctic, Afrotropical and Oriental regions.

Species
A. alticola (Mesnil, 1953)
A. angustifrons (Malloch, 1930)
A. brunnescens (Villeneuve, 1921)
A. crassulata (Mesnil, 1953)
A. fera (Mesnil, 1954)
A. laboriosa (Mesnil, 1957)
A. laticornis (Malloch, 1930
A. nigronitens (Mesnil, 1954)
A. norma (Malloch, 1929)
A. orientalis Townsend, 1926
A. perispoliata (Mesnil, 1953) (Synonym: A. mallochiana (Gardner, 1940))
A. picturata (Mesnil, 1977)
A. pudica (Mesnil, 1954)
A. samarensis (Villeneuve, 1921)
A. selangor (Malloch, 1930
A. selecta (Pandellé, 1894)
A. siphonoides (Strobl, 1898)
A. speciosa (Mesnil, 1954)
A. starkei (Mesnil, 1952)
A. verralli (Wainwright, 1928)
A. xanthosoma (Mesnil, 1954)

References

Tachininae
Tachinidae genera
Taxa named by Charles Henry Tyler Townsend